The News Corporation takeover bid for BSkyB was a proposed takeover of British Sky Broadcasting (BSkyB) by News Corporation, the media conglomerate of Rupert Murdoch. The bid was launched in June 2010 but was withdrawn in July 2011 following the News International phone hacking scandal. News Corporation already owned 39.1% of BSkyB and held onto its stake following the collapse of the takeover bid. The takeover was an essential part of News Corporation's business strategy, not least as it would have made possible integration with other entities such as Sky Deutschland and Sky Italia. The Guardian went so far as to say that, "Without a full takeover of BSkyB, News Corp's global satellite strategy would look an unco-ordinated mess."

The first key turning point in the planned takeover was the removal in December 2010 of regulatory approval from Vince Cable, who had told undercover reporters from The Daily Telegraph he had "declared war" on Murdoch. When these comments were made public, the final say on the deal went instead to Jeremy Hunt. Cable's comments on this matter were not published by the Telegraph but were instead leaked to then BBC journalist Robert Peston, most likely (according to a later Telegraph investigation) by two former Telegraph employees who had moved to News International, a News Corporation subsidiary. Hunt was much more sympathetic to the takeover bid than Cable.

The second turning point was the series of revelations in early July of the hacking of the phones of non-celebrity victims by the News of the World, a tabloid newspaper published by News International. Details of the activities, especially regarding the paper's hacking into the voicemail of murder victim Milly Dowler, sparked widespread outrage against News Corporation. Attempts to defuse the scandal by closing the News of the World and publishing an apology by Murdoch both failed. In the face of a planned motion in the House of Commons calling on News Corporation to abandon the bid, they acquiesced.

Offer
On 15 June 2010, BSkyB announced that it had rejected an offer from News Corporation to take full control of the company. News Corp had offered 700p per share for the remaining 60.9% of shares that it did not own. BSkyB said that it would only consider offers of at least 800p per share.

Regulatory issues
Although the two companies had not agreed on a revised takeover proposal, News Corporation announced its intention to seek regulatory approval from the European Commission in November. The Commission unconditionally approved the proposal the following month.

The proposal was also reviewed by the British government. On 4 November 2010 Business Secretary Vince Cable referred the takeover bid to Ofcom to consider issues of media plurality. In July 2011 it was reported that around this time News Corp's News International subsidiary had "bullied" the Liberal Democrats. The Observer said that "According to one account from a senior party figure, a cabinet minister was told that, if the government did not do as NI wanted, the Lib Dems would be 'done over' by the Murdoch papers."

In late December 2010, undercover reporters from The Daily Telegraph, posing as constituents, set up a meeting with Cable, in which he made some unguarded remarks about the coalition, including a description of the coalition's attempt at fast, widespread reforms (including the health service and local governments) as being a "kind of Maoist revolution". When his comments appeared in the press on 21 December, Cable stated, "Naturally I am embarrassed by these comments and I regret them", before reaffirming his commitment to the coalition government, stating that "I am proud of what it is achieving". In May 2011 the Press Complaints Commission upheld a complaint regarding the Telegraph'''s use of subterfuge: "On this occasion, the commission was not convinced that the public interest was such as to justify proportionately this level of subterfuge."

In an undisclosed part of the Telegraph transcript, Cable stated in reference to Rupert Murdoch's News Corporation takeover bid for BSkyB, "I have declared war on Mr Murdoch and I think we are going to win." This was given to the BBC's Robert Peston by a whistleblower unhappy that the Telegraph had not published Cable's comments in full, and also published on 21 December. Following this revelation Cable had his responsibility for media affairs – including ruling on Murdoch's takeover plans – withdrawn from his role as business secretary that same day. In July 2011 a firm of private investigators hired by the Telegraph to track the source of the leak concluded "strong suspicion" that two former Telegraph employees who had moved to News International, one of them Will Lewis, had gained access to the transcript and audio files and leaked them to Peston.

After the business secretary Vince Cable was stripped of his jurisdiction over the deal, the proposal was referred to Jeremy Hunt, the Secretary of State for culture, media and sport. Hunt initially elected not to refer to the deal to the Competition Commission, announcing on 3 March 2011 that he intended to accept a series of undertakings given by News Corporation, paving the way for the deal to be approved. The undertakings would have led to Sky News being severed from BSkyB. On 23 June it was reported that News Corp had reached an agreement with Ofcom to approve the takeover, on the basis of Sky News becoming a separate company.

By early July, despite public opposition to the deal, "Government says its ready to give clearance to deal. Jeremy Hunt gives opponents one final week to raise objections. However, he has provisionally agreed to proposals that will see Sky News be spun off as an independent company to allay fears the deal would give Mr Murdoch's News Corporation too much control of the media. After the consultation ends on July 8, Mr Hunt is expected to wave the merger through once and for all. He is keen to give final confirmation by July 19 when the summer parliamentary recess begins." Several days later, with the News of the World phone hacking scandal exploding, Ofcom intervened, saying that it has "a duty to be satisfied on an ongoing basis that the holder of a broadcasting licence is 'fit and proper'".

Bid withdrawn
It was in the wake of the Milly Dowler phone hacking allegations that a significant number of people, including former deputy prime minister John Prescott and other politicians, began to seriously question whether the takeover of BSkyB by News Corporation ought to be blocked. The Media Standards Trust formed the pressure group Hacked Off, to campaign for a public inquiry. Soon after launch, the campaign gained the support of suspected hacking victim, the actor Hugh Grant, who became a public spokesperson, appearing on Question Time and Newsnight.''

In July 2011, during the News International phone hacking scandal, BSkyB shares plummeted and Hunt received well over 150,000 submissions from members of the public, driven by efforts by campaign groups Avaaz.org and 38 Degrees. Most submissions were opposed to News Corp taking full control of BSkyB. News Corp subsequently withdrew undertakings made as part of negotiations with the government, triggering an immediate referral of the proposal to the Competition Commission.

Numerous analysts and commentators suggested that as a result of the phone hacking scandal, it would be politically difficult or impossible for News Corp to proceed with its takeover plans. In addition to public pressure for the deal to be withdrawn or for the Government to halt the proposal, Britain's major political parties all expressed the view that the deal should not go ahead. The Liberal Democrats and the Conservatives both indicated that they would support an opposition day motion from Labour calling on News Corp to rescind its offer.

On 13 July, shortly before the House of Commons was due to debate the motion, News Corporation announced that it would be withdrawing its proposal to take complete ownership of BSkyB. Chase Carey, the corporation's deputy chairman, stated that it was "too difficult to progress" with the proposed takeover given the phone hacking controversy.

In a symbolic gesture, the House later passed the opposition day motion unanimously by acclamation.

In 2018 when Comcast Corporation has attempted to purchased Sky plc. Sky is now owned by Comcast today.

References

News Corporation
News International phone hacking scandal
Attempted mergers and acquisitions
2010 mergers and acquisitions
2011 mergers and acquisitions
Sky Group
2010 in British politics
2011 in British politics
2010 in British television
2011 in British television